Bhagya Jyothi (Kannada: ಭಾಗ್ಯ ಜ್ಯೋತಿ) is a 1975 Indian Kannada film,  directed by K. S. L. Swamy and produced by Gopal-Lakshman. The movie, based on a novel by Mangala Satyan is a mirror to society's take on the caste system. The film stars Vishnuvardhan, Bharathi Vishnuvardhan and Shubha in the lead roles. The film has musical score by Vijaya Bhaskar. The Sanskrit song 'Divya Gagana Vanavasini' sung by P.B. Srinivas and Vani Jairam and picturized for a sequence from the Kalidasa play 'Vikramorvasheeyam' is a major highlight of the film.

Cast

Vishnuvardhan
Bharathi Vishnuvardhan
Shubha
B. Saroja Devi in Special Appearance
B. V. Radha
Ambareesh
K. S. Ashwath
Leelavathi
C. H. Lokanath
Shivaram
Vedavalli
Seetharam
M. N. Babu
B. Hanumanthachar
Ashwath Narayan
Chethan
Dikki Madhavarao
Prabhakar
Puttanna
Sanjeev
M. V. V. Swamy
Sriranga Murthy
Manmatha Rao
Vasudev
Dr. Sridhar
Master Arun

Soundtrack
The music was composed by Vijaya Bhaskar.

References

External links
 

1975 films
1970s Kannada-language films
Films scored by Vijaya Bhaskar
Films directed by K. S. L. Swamy